Walter Reynolds (24 November 1911 – 1995) was an English professional footballer who played as a winger.

References

1911 births
1995 deaths
Footballers from Sheffield
English footballers
Sheffield Wednesday F.C. players
Leeds United F.C. players
Leyton Orient F.C. players
Burnley F.C. players
Newport County A.F.C. players
Accrington Stanley F.C. (1891) players
York City F.C. players
Rochdale A.F.C. players
English Football League players
Association football wingers